Local elections in Adamawa State, Nigeria were held on 10 April 2022.

Results 
All 22 seats were won by the Peoples Democratic Party.

References

See also 

Adamawa State local elections
April 2022 events in Nigeria
2022 local elections in Nigeria